Kirill Alexeyev, also transliterated as Alexeev, (born February 27, 1981) is a Russian former professional ice hockey player.

Following five seasons in the Quebec Major Junior Hockey League, Alexeyev played briefly in the United Hockey League with both the Kalamazoo Wings and Flint Generals before making his Russian Superleague debut with Amur Khabarovsk during the 2002–03 season.

He made his Kontinental Hockey League (KHL) debut with HC Sibir Novosibirsk during the 2008–09 KHL season.

References

External links

1981 births
Living people
Drummondville Voltigeurs players
Flint Generals players
HC Sibir Novosibirsk players
Kalamazoo Wings (UHL) players
Rouyn-Noranda Huskies players
Russian ice hockey defencemen
People from Apatity
Sportspeople from Murmansk Oblast